Filip Jan Rymsza (born December 29, 1977) is a Polish-born filmmaker and writer. He is best known for, along with fellow producer Frank Marshall, spearheading the successful completion of Orson Welles' last major work, The Other Side of the Wind. Filmed in the early 1970s but not fully edited, the completed movie debuted at the 75th annual Venice Film Festival in August 2018. He was also a producer on the award-winning Morgan Neville documentary They'll Love Me When I'm Dead.

Rymsza made his feature film directorial debut in 2020, with Mosquito State. It premiered at the 77th Venice Film Festival, where it was awarded the Bisaro d'Oro for Best Cinematography.

Mosquito State was released by AMC Networks on Shudder. It was The New York Times Critic's Pick, described as "a disquieting merger of body horror and social commentary... pierced by moments of disturbing beauty".

Biography
Filip Jan Rymsza was born on December 29, 1977, in Olecko, Poland.  After the Soviet-sponsored Polish government imposed martial law in December 1981, his father, Wladyslaw Rymsza, faced jail time for his involvement with the pro-democratic Solidarity trade union. Wladyslaw Rymsza and his wife, Alina, fled to Chicago. They were joined by their son in 1985. Filip Jan Rymsza studied philosophy and economics at the University of Chicago.  He is a principal in Royal Road Entertainment, which is based in Los Angeles.

 Filmography 

 Awards 
Mosquito State ― Anatomy Crime and Horror Film Festival ―  Best Picture: All Categories
Mosquito State ― Anatomy Crime and Horror Film Festival ―  Best Director: All Categories
Mosquito State ― Horrorant Film Festival ―  Best Feature Film
Mosquito State ― Horrorant Film Festival ―  Best Director
Mosquito State ― Geneva International Film Festival ― Reflet d'Or (Best Feature Film)
Mosquito State ― Sitges Film Festival ― Secció Oficial Fantàstic (Best Visual Effects)
Mosquito State ― Gdynia Film Festival ― Golden Claw (Best Feature Film)
The Other Side of the Wind and They'll Love Me When I'm Dead ― National Board of Review ― William K. Everson Award for Film History
 The Other Side of the Wind ― National Society of Film Critics ― Film Heritage Award 
 The Other Side of the Wind ― Los Angeles Film Critics Association'''  ― Special citation

Writing
 As I Stared into the Still, Sleepless Night (2003)
 Key Point Three (Repeating)'' (2004)

External links
 
Royal Road Entertainment

References 

Polish film directors
Polish film producers
Polish screenwriters
Polish male writers
Polish writers
Polish agnostics
1977 births
Living people